The Lane House, also known as the Richard Lane House, near Kensington, Georgia is listed on the National Register of Historic Places.

It is a Gothic Revival-style house built c.1855-1859.

It is also a contributing building in the McLemore Cove Historic District.

References

Houses on the National Register of Historic Places in Georgia (U.S. state)
Gothic Revival architecture in Georgia (U.S. state)
Houses completed in 1857
National Register of Historic Places in Walker County, Georgia
Houses in Walker County, Georgia